Philip Anthony Ashworth (born 14 April 1953), is an English former professional footballer who played as a striker. In 1981, he was playing with the Swedish team GAIS.

References

External links

1953 births
Living people
Footballers from Burnley
English footballers
Association football forwards
Blackburn Rovers F.C. players
AFC Bournemouth players
Workington A.F.C. players
Southport F.C. players
Rochdale A.F.C. players
Portsmouth F.C. players
Scunthorpe United F.C. players
GAIS players
English Football League players
English expatriate footballers
English expatriate sportspeople in Sweden
Expatriate footballers in Sweden